Asmara (Love) is an Indonesian soap opera television series that aired on RCTI daily at 7:00 p.m. in 2012. Produced by SinemArt, it starred Velove Vexia, Glenn Alinskie, Yasmine Wildblood, Fero Walandouw, Arifin Putra, and others.

Cast 
 Velove Vexia as Asmara
 Yasmin Wildblood as Cinta
 Tsania Marwa as Flora
 Alice Norin as Nora
 Fero Walandouw as Petir
 Glenn Alinskie as Januari
 Arifin Putra as Don
 Atalarik Syah as Praja
 Jihan Fahira as Anya
 Ponco Buwono as Dhamar
 Ana Pinem as Inem
 Tengku Firmansyah as Maulana
 Marini Zumarnis as Asti

External links 
 Asmara Plot
 Asmara (sinetron) - Wikipedia Bahasa Indonesia ensiklopedia bebas

2012 Indonesian television series debuts
2012 Indonesian television series endings
Indonesian television soap operas